Kiril Ivanov Gospodinov (1934–2003) was a Bulgarian theater and film actor. His acting created one of the eminent characters in the Bulgarian film art.

Biography and career

Gospodinov was born on 24 May 1934 in Grozdyovo village, Varna Province. After graduating as an actor in The National Academy for Theatre and Film Arts in 1966, he started working with the Varna Theater where he has stayed for five years. In 1971 he moved to Sofia to work with the Sofia Theater.

The first films featuring him are Ponedelnik sutrin / Monday Morning (1966) and The Swedish Kings (1968). In 1970 the Bulgarian National Television released the TV film Bash Maystorat / The Past-Master with Kiril Gospodinov in the leading role as Rangel Lelin-the past-master. This satirical comedy turned him and his character in "Trade Mark" for the Bulgarian film art. The film had four more sequels throughout the years. Generations have identified Gospodinov as The Past-Master till nowadays.

Another landmark in his career, apart from the past-master roles, turned out to be the film Three Reservists. Released in 1971, the film won numerous awards in the Varna Film Festival one of which was for Gospodinov's leading role .

He continued filming as well as performing on the stage of the theater during the next two decades leaving fadeless trail with his roles such as his remarkable performance in the film classic from 1972 - The Boy Turns Man. In 1984 he was decorated with the high government prize the Order Of Saint Cyril And Saint Methodius.

The miserable economic and culture conditions in the country during the 1990s had an awful effect on the film industry as well as on the actors living standard.

Gospodinov died in 2003 at the age of 69.

Filmography

References
Bulgarian National Film Archive 
Actors Biography
Bulgarian National Television - Film details

External links
 

Bulgarian male film actors
Bulgarian male stage actors
1934 births
2003 deaths
People from Varna Province
20th-century Bulgarian male actors
21st-century Bulgarian male actors